Ambling Alp may refer to:
 
"Ambling Alp", a song on Yeasayer's 2010 album Odd Blood
Primo Carnera (1906–1967), Italian boxer's nickname